Twin Mountain is an unincorporated community within the town of Carroll in the White Mountains of New Hampshire, United States. It is named for two prominent summits which rise to the south of the village, North Twin Mountain and South Twin Mountain.

The village is located at the junction of U.S. highways 3 and 302, two major routes through the White Mountain notches. The Ammonoosuc River flows through the center of the village.

Twin Mountain has a separate ZIP code (03595) from the rest of the town of Carroll.

Opened in 1964, it has one runway (headings 9 and 27). Its area control center is Boston Center, while its flight service station is Bangor, Maine. Its usage (as of 2019) is 60% transient general aviation and 40% local general aviation.

References

External links
Village of Twin Mountain
Twin Mountain-Bretton Woods Chamber of Commerce

Unincorporated communities in New Hampshire
Unincorporated communities in Coös County, New Hampshire